The 2018–19 Ranji Trophy was the 85th season of the Ranji Trophy, the first-class cricket tournament that took place in India. It was contested by 37 teams, divided into four groups, with nine teams in the Plate Group. The group stage ran from 1 November 2018 to 10 January 2019. The top team from the Plate Group progressed to the quarter-finals of the competition. The teams in the Plate Group were allowed to have up to three professional players in their squads.

All of the matches in the first round of fixtures reached a result within three days, with Uttarakhand beating Bihar in two days. Nagaland beat Mizoram by an innings and 333 runs, the biggest winning margin for a team making its debut in the Ranji Trophy. Pondicherry made their debut in the second round of the tournament, against Meghalaya.

In fifth round match between Pondicherry and Arunachal Pradesh, Paras Dogra scored his eighth double century. He broke Ajay Sharma's record of the most double centuries by a batsman in the Ranji Trophy.

In the sixth round of fixtures, Milind Kumar of Sikkim became the first batsman to score 1,000 runs in this edition of the tournament. He did so in the match against Mizoram, in his ninth innings of the competition. In round seven of the tournament, Ashutosh Aman of Bihar became the first bowler to take 50 wickets in this years' Ranji Trophy tournament. He went on to finish the tournament with 68 wickets, breaking the previous record of 64 dismissals set by Bishan Singh Bedi in the 1974–75 tournament. Round eight saw Pankaj Singh of Pondicherry become the first seam bowler to take 400 wickets in the Ranji Trophy.

Uttarakhand won the Plate Group and advanced to the quarter-finals.

Points table

Fixtures

Round 1

Round 2

Round 3

Round 4

Round 5

Round 6

Round 7

Round 8

Round 9

References

Ranji Trophy seasons
Ranji Trophy Plate Group
Ranji Trophy
Ranji Trophy